Leinfellner is a surname. Notable people with the surname include:

 Elisabeth Leinfellner (1938–2010), linguist and philosopher of Science
 Werner Leinfellner (1921–2010), philosopher of Science